Shinji Kanki is a Japanese composer. He has composed music for dolphins according to conventions found in dolphin music or found to please dolphins in his Music for Dolphins (Ultrasonic Improvisational Composition) for underwater ultrasonic loudspeakers (2001).

Other of his pieces include PCM 0355+53 for the Helsinki Computer Orchestra.

External links

Year of birth missing (living people)
21st-century classical composers
21st-century Japanese musicians
21st-century Japanese male musicians
Japanese classical composers
Japanese male classical composers
Living people
Place of birth missing (living people)